"X-Kid" is a song by American rock band Green Day. It is the fifth track on their eleventh studio album, ¡Tré! (2012), and was released as the second single from the album on February 12, 2013, and is the sixth and final single from the ¡Uno!, ¡Dos! & ¡Tré! trilogy.

Background and release
"X-Kid" was released as a single on February 12, 2013. On December 19, 2012, a video was released to Green Day's official YouTube channel showing "X-Kid" playing on a cassette tape.

Theme and composition

According to The A.V. Club, "X-Kid" has "a rousing intro degenerates into a hybrid of two songs from the band’s 1991 album Kerplunk, “Who Wrote Holden Caulfield?” and “One Of My Lies.”"

Song meaning
“X-Kid” from ¡Tré! deals with the suicide of a close friend of the band's. “I don’t really want to get into it,” Armstrong says. “It’s too heavy.”

This song was written in response to the 2009 suicide of a close friend that Armstrong grew up with in Rodeo, CA. However, the song is as much about the entire "Generation X" (those born from roughly 1965–1980) as it is about this one specific tragedy. Billie Joe has repeatedly identified himself as an "Ex-Kid" in recent interviews. The narrator is able to relate to his late friend, in that they were both "Ex/X-kids." But, he was able to push through the struggles that came with growing older, while his friend was not. His friend, unfortunately, found an escape in suicide, thus the line "Here goes nothing, the shouting's over." The narrator sees facets of himself in his late friend. He feels as if, sadly, there wasn't much that could have been done to help his friend, though he wishes someone could have found a way to help him before it was too late.

Credits and Personnel
Songwriting: Billie Joe Armstrong, Mike Dirnt, Tré Cool
Production: Rob Cavallo, Green Day

Critical reception
Ray Rahman of Entertainment Weekly named "X-Kid" as the best song on ¡Tre!, above "Brutal Love" and "Missing You".

Chart positions

References

2013 singles
Green Day songs
Songs written by Billie Joe Armstrong
Warner Records singles
Reprise Records singles
2012 songs
Song recordings produced by Rob Cavallo
Commemoration songs
Songs written by Tré Cool
Songs written by Mike Dirnt